Río Grande is a town in the municipality of San Martín de Hidalgo in the state of Jalisco, Mexico. It has a population of 141 inhabitants.

References

External links 

Populated places in Jalisco